David Provan (11 March 1941 – 26 November 2016)  was a Scottish professional footballer, who played for Rangers, Crystal Palace, Plymouth Argyle and St Mirren. Provan also played for Scotland and the Scottish League XI.

Career
Provan was a product of the Rangers youth team and played as a full back. He made his debut on 27 December 1958, in a league match away to Third Lanark which Rangers won 3–2. He helped the club win a domestic treble in 1963–64 and played in the 1967 European Cup Winners' Cup Final, which Rangers lost 1–0 to Bayern Munich. Provan is one of the players elected to Rangers' Hall of Fame.

He left the club in June 1970 and joined English club Crystal Palace, although he was not there for long, making only two senior appearances in total, before moving on in March 1971, to Plymouth Argyle. He stayed at Plymouth for five seasons and made over 100 appearances.

Provan subsequently played for St Mirren where he finished his senior career in 1975, and began his coaching career under then-manager Alex Ferguson. He later went on to manage Albion Rovers from 1987 to 1991, leading the club to the Scottish Football League Second Division title in 1988–9.

Rangers FC announced on 26 November 2016 that Provan had died, following a long illness.

References

External links

1941 births
2016 deaths
Footballers from Falkirk
Association football fullbacks
Scottish footballers
Scotland international footballers
Rangers F.C. players
Crystal Palace F.C. players
Plymouth Argyle F.C. players
St Mirren F.C. players
Scottish football managers
Albion Rovers F.C. managers
Rangers F.C. non-playing staff
Scottish Football League players
English Football League players
Scottish Football League representative players
Scotland under-23 international footballers
Scottish Football League managers
Place of death missing